Joseph Holmes (December 31, 1736 – August 31, 1809) was an American politician, who served on the New Jersey Legislative Council, the precursor to the New Jersey Senate, between 1777 and 1779.

Biography
A resident of Upper Freehold Township, Monmouth County, Holmes was first elected to the County Board of Justices and Freeholders, the precursor to the Board of Chosen Freeholders, in 1768, and served until May 1776. He again served from May 1782 to May 1783, from 1786 to 1787, and from 1794 to 1803. He was chairman of the board from May 1794 to May 1795, and from May 1796 to May 1797. He later served on the Upper Freehold Township Committee.

Death

Holmes died on August 31, 1809, and is buried in the Olde Yellow Meeting House Yard, Upper Freehold Township.

See also
List of Monmouth County Freeholder Directors

Notes and references
 

Members of the New Jersey Legislative Council
County commissioners in New Jersey
People from Upper Freehold Township, New Jersey
1736 births
1809 deaths